Talvisalo ice rink is an indoor arena and ice rink in Savonlinna, Finland.  The arena was built in 1978 and has a capacity of 2,833 spectators. It is the home of SaPKo, in the Mestis ice hockey league (the second league in Finland, behind Liiga).

History
In 2008 Gigantti became the main sponsor of SaPKo, and the arena was named after them as Gigantti arena. Gigantti's sponsorship agreement with SaPKo ended in 2011, and the arena returned to its original name.

References

Indoor arenas in Finland
Indoor ice hockey venues in Finland
Savonlinna
Buildings and structures in South Savo